Satama-Sokoro is a town in northeastern Ivory Coast. It is a sub-prefecture and commune of Dabakala Department in Hambol Region, Vallée du Bandama District.

In 2014, the population of the sub-prefecture of Satama-Sokoro was 18,209 18,209.

Villages
The 14 villages of the sub-prefecture of Satama-Sokoro and their population in 2014 are:

Notes

Sub-prefectures of Hambol
Communes of Hambol